Malena Mård (born 23 March 1969) is a Swedish diplomat who served as the Head of the European Union Delegation in Azerbaijan from 2014 until 2017. She became the Swedish Ambassador to the Russian Federation when she presented her credentials, on September 3, 2019, to Deputy Minister of Foreign Affairs of Russia Vladimir Titov.

Mard graduated from Uppsala University and earned a MSc in Business Administration and Economics.

References

1969 births
Living people
Swedish women ambassadors
Ambassadors of Sweden to Russia
Uppsala University alumni

Ambassadors of the European Union to Azerbaijan